Vysheslavskoye is a rural locality (a selo) in Seletskoye Rural Settlement, Suzdalsky District, Vladimir Oblast, Russia. The population was 14 as of 2010. There are 5 streets.

Geography 
Vysheslavskoye is located 16 km southwest of Suzdal (the district's administrative centre) by road. Semyonovskoye-Sovetskoye is the nearest rural locality.

References 

Rural localities in Suzdalsky District
Suzdalsky Uyezd